Belle River is a 2022 Canadian short documentary film directed by Guillaume Fournier, Samuel Matteau and Yannick Nolin. The third film in a trilogy about Cajun culture in Louisiana following the films Laissez les bon temps rouler in 2017 and Acadiana in 2019, the film profiles the residents of Pierre Part as they cope with the threat of their community being flooded by the possible but ultimately averted opening of the Morganza Spillway during the Mississippi River floods of 2019.

The film premiered at the 2022 Clermont-Ferrand International Short Film Festival. It had its North American premiere at SXSW, and was later screened at the Hot Docs Canadian International Documentary Festival and the DOXA Documentary Film Festival.

The film was named to the Toronto International Film Festival's annual year-end Canada's Top Ten list for 2022.

References

External links
 

2022 films
2022 short documentary films
Canadian short documentary films
Films shot in Louisiana
French-language Canadian films
2020s French-language films
2020s Canadian films